Chaudoirina is a genus of beetles in the family Carabidae, containing the following species:

 Chaudoirina nigrofasciata (Solier, 1849)
 Chaudoirina orfilai (Mateu, 1954)
 Chaudoirina vianai (Liebke, 1939)

References

Lebiinae